U.S. Route 29 (US 29) is a major north–south route in the Commonwealth of Virginia.

Since 1928, when Virginia General Assembly passed Senate Bill 64, much of US 29 in Virginia is known as the Seminole Trail. Through Northern Virginia, it is known as Lee Highway, except in Falls Church, where it acts as the east/west divider for city streets and is called North or South Washington Street, and Arlington, where it was renamed Langston Boulevard in July 2021.  On April 7, 1993, the Virginia General Assembly officially designated the entire length of US 29 from the North Carolina border to the Potomac River as the "29th Infantry Division Memorial Highway" in honor of that Army unit, which, along with the 1st Infantry Division, formed the spearhead of the American infantry that landed on the morning of June 6, 1944, on Omaha Beach in Normandy as part of the invasion of France to liberate that country during World War II. These divisions next fought their way across France, and into Germany. In addition, the name of this highway serves to honor many members of the Virginia Army National Guard who serve as part of this National Guard Division today. Signs indicating this designation have been placed periodically on both sides of US 29.

For most of its route through Virginia, US 29 has been constructed to be at least four lanes along its route, with the two short exceptions being where the highway passes through Manassas National Battlefield Park, where it is two lanes wide for approximately three miles, and through Fairfax and Arlington counties, where it is sometimes wider. It can also be 6 and 8 lanes in much of Northern Albemarle County.

US 29 in Virginia has eleven highway by-pass routes around various cities and towns. These bypasses are around Danville, Chatham, Gretna, Hurt-Altavista, Lynchburg-Madison Heights-Amherst, Lovingston, Charlottesville, Madison, Culpeper, Remington, and Warrenton.  In addition, Interstate 66 serves for the most part as a by-pass of Manassas and also Fairfax and Arlington.

Route description

North Carolina to Lynchburg 

US 29 enters Virginia in Danville from North Carolina, immediately splitting into business and by-pass routes. US 29 joins the Danville Expressway and US 58 around the east side of Danville, entering Pittsylvania County, and re-merging with the business route north of town in Blairs. The interchange where the split of US 29 into Business and Bypass routes/junction with US 58 occurs has ramps that enter North Carolina and ramps that enter Virginia, complete with welcome signs from each state. There is a cloverleaf ramp that dips into North Carolina from Virginia and then crosses the state lines back into Virginia. Created , SR 785 is numbered in contradiction to the conventional system of numbering in the state, where primary routes are numbered less than 600 and secondary routes at or above this number. It is numbered as such because it is part of the planned Interstate 785, which will run south along US 29 to Interstate 85 in Greensboro, North Carolina, and is only one of two routes of this type. The other is Route 895 in Richmond for similar reasons.

Lynchburg to Charlottesville 

US 29 then continues north where it splits into business and by-pass routes for Chatham, Gretna, and Hurt before entering Campbell County.

The next major city is Lynchburg. US 29 joins the US 460 by-pass and US 501 east of Lynchburg, splitting from them just before entering Amherst County.  US 29 again bypasses Madison Heights and Amherst as an expressway, enters Nelson County, passes the town of Lovingston, and enters into Albemarle County.

Charlottesville to Warrenton 
For the next few miles of US 29's route north of Lovingston, it enters mountainous terrain in the far western Piedmont close to the Blue Ridge Mountains. Several miles later, the route then continues north to Charlottesville, intersecting Interstate 64 and by-passing downtown Charlottesville. US 29 rejoins its congested business route just north of downtown, continuing north as a 6 lane road through Charlottesville's business district. Past Charlottesville, it converts back to 4 lanes and continues through Greene and Madison Counties, and then turns north-east toward Culpeper.  US 15 joins US 29 around Culpeper, and heads to Warrenton, entering Northern Virginia.

Warrenton to Washington, D.C. 

US 29 / 15 is joined by US 17 south of Warrenton in Fauquier County, and continues around the town, with US 17 splitting off.  US 29/15 continues mostly eastward to Gainesville where US 15 splits and US 29 intersects Interstate 66 for the first time.  US 29 continues into Fairfax County, where it passes along the boundary of the city of Falls Church, where the road has two different names.  The portion of the street running northbound is located in the City of Falls Church is called Washington Boulevard, and has different street addresses than the other side running southbound in Fairfax County, where it is named Lee Highway.  The road continues into Arlington, having intersected I-66 five more times before crossing into the District.

History
US 29 originated in 1931 as a replacement of US 170 from Danville to Lynchburg. It was then added to VA 18 between Lynchburg and Charlottesville, and to VA 28 between Charlottesville and Culpeper. The route originally ended at US 15 in Culpeper. In 1934, US 29 was extended to run concurrently with US 15 to Warrenton, and with US 211 to Washington DC (US 211 now ends at US 29 Business in Warrenton).

The portion of what is now US 29 from the North Carolina state line to Warrenton was named the Seminole Trail by an act of the Virginia General Assembly on February 16, 1928. Although it was apparently not part of the National Auto Trails initiative early in the 20th century, the Seminole Trail is believed to have originated as part of an effort to promote the road as a through-route to Florida, home of the Native American Seminole tribe. Many road maps of the 1930s and 1940s list the Seminole Trail on highways in Virginia, the Carolinas, Georgia and ultimately Florida.

In an October 4, 2006, meeting of the Albemarle County Board of Supervisors, the University of Virginia athletic department and basketball coach Dave Leitao suggested that Seminole Trail in Charlottesville should be renamed Cavalier Way. The board did not act on this suggestion.

Gainesville Interchange
The Gainesville Interchange project took place at the interchange between Lee Highway (US 29) and Interstate 66 at the junction with Linton Hall Road (SR 619) starting in July 2011, with board planning on it dating back to 2006. The project was worth $230 million and included interchanges at many other heavily traveled roads in the area due to the rapid growth in development in Gainesville and Haymarket, along with it being a major area drivers departure off of I-66 to travel towards other major cities along Lee Highway, such as Charlottesville. Reasoning for this is because of the lack of road development to accommodate the new heavy traffic in the area. The plan included a single point interchange design and bridges over train tracks to ease traffic flow on Lee Highway onto I-66. Lee Highway was also widened around the interchange to combat this issue. What was once a two-lane country road is now a four lane suburban highway. Land was acquired by VDOT at the intersection of US 29 and Linton Hall Road/SR 619. The entire project was completed and opened to the general public on July 9, 2015.

Charlottesville Interchange (Rio Road) 
The Charlottesville Interchange project took place at the intersection of US 29 and Rio Road/SR 631, with construction starting in summer 2015 and ending in December 2016. A diamond interchange was built, with two lanes from each direction of US 29, deemed the 'local lanes,' exiting from main traffic and meeting Rio Rd at a traffic signal. The project cost $69.7 million.

Lynchburg Interchange 
The Lynchburg Interchange project took place at the intersection of US 29/US 460/US 501 and Odd Fellows Road, with construction starting in January 2016 and ending in August 2018. A diamond interchange was constructed at a cost of about $30 million. The interchange was built to reduce congestion on Candlers Mountain Drive/US 501 and to make access to Mayflower Dr/SR 128 easier. As part of the construction, roundabouts were constructed on Odd Fellows Road at its intersection with Mayflower Drive, west of the interchange, and Top Ridge Road, east of the interchange.

Charlottesville Bypass 
A western Route 29 bypass around Charlottesville was originally proposed in 1979. Engineering and environmental work on the project began in late 1984 and the location was approved by the Commonwealth Transportation Board in 1990.

Acquisition of right of way for the project began in 1991 and continued until 2001. No additional right of way has been purchased since then. VDOT owns 36 properties that are currently leased and occupied.

The bypass was projected to be 6.2 miles long, from the US 250 bypass to current US 29 north of the South Fork of the Rivanna River. It would have been two lanes in each direction with no other exits, to decrease possible interruption of commercial and residential growth in the area.

In 1998 a lawsuit was filed challenging the project, alleging that the environmental impact review of the project violated the National Environmental Policy Act (NEPA). In 2001 the federal court ruled in favor of VDOT on the suit but required the agency to complete a Supplemental Environmental Impact Statement addressing the road's impacts on the South Fork Rivanna Reservoir and the mitigation to minimize those impacts. That document was completed and accepted by the Federal Highway Administration in 2003.

In 1996 the Charlottesville-Albemarle Metropolitan Planning Organization (MPO) inserted language into its Transportation Improvement Program that prevented additional funds from being allocated to construction of the Western Bypass. That language was removed by the MPO Policy Board in July 2011.

All activities on the Route 29 Charlottesville Bypass project were suspended in March 2014 following notification from the Federal Highway Administration that a new Supplemental Environmental Impact Statement would be required before the environmental process could be completed. The new Supplemental EIS was required due to the history of litigation and controversy associated with the project.

Future

Charlottesville Interchange (Hydraulic Road) 
The Charlottesville City Council voted on May 6, 2018, to add a long-range development plan for a diamond interchange at the intersection of US 29 and Hydraulic Road/SR 743 at an estimated cost of $63–80 million.

Major intersections

See also
 Special routes of U.S. Route 29
 Missing persons cases along U.S. Route 29 in Virginia

References

External links

Virginia Highways Project: US 29
Great Virginia Drives - U.S. 29: The Seminole Trail

 Virginia
29
U.S. Route 029
U.S. Route 029
U.S. Route 029
U.S. Route 029
U.S. Route 029
U.S. Route 029
U.S. Route 029
U.S. Route 029
U.S. Route 029
U.S. Route 029
U.S. Route 029
U.S. Route 029
U.S. Route 029
U.S. Route 029
U.S. Route 029
U.S. Route 029
U.S. Route 029
U.S. Route 029
Expressways in the United States